Kolt may refer to:

 Kolt, a type of personal ornament used in mediaeval Rus
 Kolt, Denmark, a suburb of the Danish city of Aarhus

KOLT may refer to:
 KOLT (AM), a radio station (690 AM) licensed to serve Terrytown, Nebraska, United States
 KOLT-FM, a radio station (100.7 FM) licensed to serve Cheyenne, Wyoming, United States
 KOLT (1320 AM), a defunct radio station licensed to serve Scottsbluff, Nebraska, which held the call sign KOLT from 1947 to 2019
 KPAW, a radio station (92.9 FM) licensed to serve F. E. Warren Air Force Base, Wyoming, which held the call sign KOLT-FM from 2007 to 2016

See also
 Colt (disambiguation)